Jermyn is an unincorporated community in Jack County, Texas, United States. It lies in the far western corner of the county near the Young County line. As of the 2000 Census, its population has been estimated at 75.

History 
Jermyn was founded in 1902; relatively recently by rural Texas standards. It was also among the last new settlements in Jack County. Named for the son of Scranton, Pennsylvania coal magnate Joseph Jermyn, the community was established as headquarters for local mining. The Gulf, Texas and Western Railroad reached Jermyn in 1909, and by the 1920s the town possessed a school, a church, a bank, several businesses and an estimated population of 213. As the use of coal subsided in favor of oil, Jermyn developed into an agricultural center for local ranchers and continued to thrive into the 1960s. The population high-water mark was reached in 1968, when Jermyn was reportedly home to 1,066 residents. In the 1970s, however, the community began a steep decline and by 1990 the population had fallen to 75, a number it maintained through to the 2000 Census.

References 

Unincorporated communities in Jack County, Texas
Unincorporated communities in Texas
Ghost towns in North Texas